Adelle Stripe (born 1976) is an English writer and journalist.

Work 
Stripe's writing is rooted in the non-fiction novel form and explores working-class culture, untold histories of Northern England, popular music, and small-town life.

Black Teeth and a Brilliant Smile, her debut novel, was based on the life and work of Bradford playwright Andrea Dunbar. A stage adaptation by Freedom Studios and screenwriter Lisa Holdsworth toured across Yorkshire in 2019.

Ten Thousand Apologies is her recent biography of cult UK band Fat White Family. It is a collaborative work with lead singer Lias Saoudi and traces the group's origins from working-class Huddersfield to Algeria, via sectarian Northern Ireland and the squats of south London.

In 2006, alongside Tony O'Neill and Ben Myers she formed possibly the first literary movement spawned via a social networking site, the Brutalists. She published three chapbook collections of poetry with Blackheath Books, including Dark Corners of Land. The Humber Star, her poem based on the experiences of her ancestors in 19th century Hessle Road, was performed at John Grant's North Atlantic Flux, for Hull UK City of Culture 2017.

Stripe studied Creative Writing at the University of Greenwich and University of Manchester. Her PhD thesis on Andrea Dunbar, non-fiction novels and contemporary northern literature was awarded by the University of Huddersfield.

As a journalist, Stripe has written features on theatre, film, literature and music for The Quietus, Yorkshire Post and Caught by the River.

Her spoken word has appeared on recordings by Smagghe & Cross and the Eccentronic Research Council.

Reception 
In 2017, writing in The Spectator, Andy Miller noted that Stripe's portrayal of Andrea Dunbar in Black Teeth and a Brilliant Smile ‘mixes fiction and biography in a manner that brings to mind the work of the late Gordon Burn. [...] The author's voice and Dunbar's mingle to create not just a portrait of an artist — funny, mischievous, reckless and truthful — but also divisions of class, geography and opportunity which continue to shape this country.’ 

Wendy Erskine, who reviewed Ten Thousand Apologies in the Irish Times, commented that Stripe ‘is a master at giving real-life novelistic momentum and shape without anything seeming forced or schematic, and she brings sharp perspicacity to every scene.’  Writing in the Observer, Miranda Sawyer described her account of Fat White Family as a 'bleak, funny and compelling biography.[…] Stripe is known for her imaginative novel/biography of Andrea Dunbar, and this book, too, though it reads pretty close to the truth, emphasises that “fact has been used to create fiction” and that people remember events differently. The difference here is Stripe is writing with, as well as about, her subject.'

Honors 
Stripe was shortlisted for the Portico Prize for Literature and the Gordon Burn Prize for her novel Black Teeth and a Brilliant Smile. Ten Thousand Apologies was nominated for the Penderyn Music Book Prize in 2023.

She was recently announced as a Burgess Fellow by the Centre for New Writing at Manchester University.

Personal life 
Stripe grew up in Tadcaster, North Yorkshire, and attended Tadcaster Grammar School. She lives in Calderdale and is married to the author Ben Myers.

Bibliography

Non-fiction 

 Ten Thousand Apologies: Fat White Family and the Miracle of Failure. White Rabbit, 2022. ISBN 9781474617840

Fiction 
 Black Teeth and a Brilliant Smile. Wrecking Ball Press, 2017. ISBN 9781903110560
 Black Teeth and a Brilliant Smile. Fleet, 2017. ISBN 9780708898956

Short Stories 
 Eight Days Left, The Manchester Review, 2018. 
 Driftwood, Common People: An Anthology of Working Class Writers, ed. Kit de Waal, Unbound, 2019. ISBN 9781783527458
 A Place Called Bliss, Flashback: Parties For the People By the People, ed. Jamie Holman and Alex Zawadzki, Rough Trade Books, 2021. ISBN 9781914236136
 The Beautiful Game, AMBIT Issue 243, 2021.
 Stay Alive Till '75. Ration Books, 2021.

Drama 
 Black Teeth and a Brilliant Smile. Adaptation by Lisa Holdsworth. Methuen Drama, 2019. ISBN 9781350135925

Essays & Journalism 
Sweating Tears with Fat White Family. Rough Trade Books, 2019. ISBN 9781912722358
New Faces in Hell, Excavate: The Wonderful and Frightening World of The Fall. Faber & Faber, 2021. ISBN 9780571358335
A Cold Day in July, New Postscripts, BBC Canvas, 2023.

Edited works, introductions and forewords 
 Alma Cogan Gordon Burn. Faber & Faber, 2019. ISBN 9780571347285
Sweet is the Taste of Tears Yosano Akiko. Tangerine Press, 2014.

References

Living people
1976 births
English women poets
English bloggers
People from Tadcaster
British women bloggers
Women anthologists
People from York
Alumni of the University of Greenwich
Alumni of the University of Manchester
Writers from Yorkshire
21st-century English women
Alumni of the University of Huddersfield